Tishrei or Tishri (tīšrē or  tīšrī; from Akkadian tašrītu "beginning", from šurrû "to begin") is the first month of the civil year (which starts on 1 Tishrei) and the seventh month of the ecclesiastical year (which starts on 1 Nisan) in the Hebrew calendar. The name of the month is Babylonian. It is a month of 30 days. Tishrei usually occurs in September–October on the Gregorian calendar.

In the Hebrew Bible the month is called Ethanim ( – ), or simply the seventh month. In the Babylonian calendar the month is known as Araḫ Tišritum, "Month of Beginning" (of the second half-year).

Edwin R. Thiele has concluded, in The Mysterious Numbers of the Hebrew Kings, that the ancient Kingdom of Judah counted years using the civil year starting in Tishrei, while the Kingdom of Israel counted years using the ecclesiastical new year starting in Nisan. Tishrei is the month used for the counting of the epoch year – i.e., the count of the year is incremented on 1 Tishrei.

Holidays in Tishrei

 1-2 Tishrei – Rosh Hashanah
 3 Tishrei – Tzom Gedaliah – (Fast Day) – On Tishrei 4 when Tishrei 3 is Shabbat
 9 Tishrei – Erev Yom Kippur
 10 Tishrei – Yom Kippur – (Fast Day)
 15–21  Tishrei – Sukkot/Sukkos
 21 Tishrei – Hoshanah Rabbah
 22 Tishrei (and 23 outside of Israel) – Shemini Atzeret/Atzeres & Simchat Torah/Simchas Torah

Tishrei in Jewish history and tradition

 1 Tishrei ( BCE) – Adam and Eve were created, according to one opinion in the Talmud.
 1 Tishrei (1923 CE) – Daf Yomi study regimen is launched.
 2 Tishrei (1659 CE) – HaRav Tuvya and HaRav Yisroel were murdered in a blood libel in Razino.
 3 Tishrei ( BCE) – Assassination of Gedaliah; now a fast day. 
 4 Tishrei (1683 CE) – King Louis XIV expelled the Jews  from all French territories in America.
 5 Tishrei (135 CE) – Rabbi Akiva is arrested.
 6 Tishrei (1964 CE) – Passing of Rebbetzin Chana Schneerson mother of the Lubavitcher Rebbe, Rabbi Menachem Mendel Schneerson.
 6 Tishrei (1939 CE) – The Wehrmacht murdered 100 Jews in Lukov, Poland, Hy"d.
 7 Tishrei ( BCE) – Taanit tzaddikim (Orach Chaim 5580:2) commemorating Hashem's decree that the Dor Hamidbar die in the wilderness because of the sin of the Eigel HaZahav / Golden Calf (according to some, (Kol-bo and others), the event took place one day earlier, on 6 Tishrei).
 8 Tishrei ( BCE) – 14-day dedication of Solomon's Temple begins.
 9 Tishrei (123 CE) – Death of the Tanna R' Elazar ben Rab' Shimon.
 10 Tishrei ( BCE) – Moses returns from a final trip to Mount Sinai, bearing a second set of tablets and a message of forgiveness for the Golden Calf.
 10 Tishrei (1973 CE) – The armies of Egypt, Syria, and other Arab states attack Israeli positions in the Sinai and Golan Heights, beginning the Yom Kippur War.
 11 Tishrei – The Baal Shem Tov writes that the day after Yom Kippur is an even greater holiday than Yom Kippur itself, a day called "Bshem HaShem" or in Yiddish "Gott's Nomen", literally "The Name of G-d".
 13 Tishrei (1882) Passing of the Rebbe Maharash, the 4th Chabad Rebbe.
 16 Tishrei (1349 CE) – The Jewish population of Krems, Germany, was massacred in the Black Death riots.
 25 Tishrei (1809 CE) – Death of Rabbi Levi Yitzchok of Berditchev

See also

 Tishrīn is the name of two Gregorian months in the Levant:
 Tishrīn al-Awwal (Arabic: تشرين الأول, literally "First Tishrin"): October. The 1973 Yom Kippur War is generally known by the name Ḥarb Tishrīn ("October War") in Syria and Lebanon, and among the Palestinians, following the Arab custom of naming the Arab-Israeli wars by months or years.
 Tishrīn al-Thāni (Arabic: تشرين الثاني, literally "Second Tishrin"): November.

External links
 Resources on the Month of Tishrei
 This Month in Jewish History

 
Months of the Hebrew calendar